Adolph Wold (30 September 1892 – 5 February 1976) was a Norwegian football player. He was born in Kristiania, and played as a wing half for Ready. He was capped 26 times for Norwegian national team scoring three goals, and played at the Antwerp Olympics in 1920, where the Norwegian team reached the quarter finals. He died in Oslo in 1976.

References

External links 
 

1892 births
1976 deaths
Footballers from Oslo
Norwegian footballers
Norway international footballers
Footballers at the 1920 Summer Olympics
Olympic footballers of Norway
Association football midfielders